The 2021 NCAA National Collegiate Women's Water Polo Championship was the 19th edition of the NCAA Women's Water Polo Championship, the annual tournament to decide the championship of NCAA women's collegiate water polo. The tournament was held May 14–16, 2021, at the Spieker Aquatics Center in Los Angeles, California, hosted by the University of California, Los Angeles (UCLA).

Qualifying teams
The field of teams was revealed in a selection show on May 3, 2021. Seven conferences were granted automatic qualification to the championship: the Big West Conference, Collegiate Water Polo Association, Golden Coast Conference, Metro Atlantic Athletic Conference, Mountain Pacific Sports Federation, Southern California Intercollegiate Athletic Conference, and Western Water Polo Association. Three additional teams gained entry into the tournament with at-large bids, with all of them coming from the MPSF.

Schedule and results
All times Pacific (UTC-07:00).

Tournament bracket

Game summaries

Opening round

References

NCAA Women's Water Polo Championship
NCAA Women's Water Polo Championship
NCAA Women's Water Polo Championship
NCAA Women's Water Polo